Fotbal Club Sheriff Tiraspol, commonly known as Sheriff Tiraspol or simply Sheriff, is a Moldovan professional football club based in Tiraspol, a city located in the unrecognised breakaway state of Transnistria. Founded in 1997 as Tiras Tiraspol and rebranded the following year as Sheriff, it quickly established itself within Moldovan football.

"The Wasps" recorded their debut in the first league in the 1998–99 season, when they also won their first trophy, the Moldovan Cup. They have since amassed twenty championship titles, eleven Cups and seven Super Cups–all competition records. On the European stage, Sheriff has reached the group stage of the UEFA Europa League on five occasions and became the first ever Moldovan side to reach the group stages of the 2021–22 UEFA Champions League, where they would go on to notch a win against eventual champions Real Madrid before eventually bowing out of the competition.

The club takes its current name from its main sponsor, Sheriff, a company which operates various industries in Transnistria. Home games are played in yellow and black kits at the Sheriff Stadium, to which the club moved in 2002 and which has a capacity of 12,746.

History

The club was originally established in 1996 and introduced in the Moldovan "B" Division as FC Tiras Tiraspol. On 4 April 1997, former policeman Viktor Gushan, owner of the conglomerate Sheriff which remains a key sponsor, refounded it as FC Sheriff Tiraspol.

Sheriff achieved promotion to the second tier of Moldovan football, the Moldovan "A" Division, and under the guidance of Ahmad Alaskarov, was charged with leading the team to the Moldovan top division. Later that year the club won the championship by 14 points, being promoted to Divizia Națională. The club won its first major honour with the 1999 Moldovan Cup. In the final at the Republican Stadium, Sheriff scored an injury-time equaliser before winning the match against Constructorul Chișinău 2–1 after extra time. Sheriff's first National Division title came in the 2000–01 season, which also included their second Moldovan Cup triumph as they beat Nistru Otaci on penalties after a goalless match. The league triumph was the first of a run of ten consecutively up to 2010, also including league-cup doubles in 2002, 2006 and 2008–10. Sheriff won each Moldovan Super Cup from 2004 to 2010, but did not have to play a match on four occasions due to winning it on default through a double. Sheriff were denied an 11th-straight title by Dacia Chișinău in 2010–11, but reclaimed the title the following season. In 2014–15, Sheriff again lost the championship despite being level with both Milsami Orhei and Dacia Chișinău at the top of the table with 55 points; Milsami would finish in first place because of its superior head-to-head record against both Sheriff and Dacia, with Dacia second and Sheriff third, despite Sheriff having the superior goal difference amongst the clubs.

The team won the Commonwealth of Independent States Cup in 2003 and 2009, becoming the first team from Moldova to win an international title. Sheriff were the first club in Moldova to sign players from Brazil and Africa.

Europe

From 2001–02 to 2008–09, the club tried to reach the group stage in the UEFA Champions League every year, but failed in the second qualifying round every time. Its European fortunes improved after 2009. Sheriff has appeared in three UEFA Europa League group stages (2009–10, 2010–11, 2013–14) with decent results, although they didn't manage to qualify to the knock-out stage. In 2017, they qualified to the group stage for the fourth time, after beating favorites Legia Warsaw on away goals in the play-off round.

2009–10 UEFA Europa League
In the 2009–10 season, Sheriff finally reached the third qualifying round when they defeated Inter Turku. In the next round, Sheriff defeated Slavia Prague 1–1 on aggregate, progressing via the away goal rule due to Nadson's 94th-minute strike in the second leg. They were then eliminated from the 2009–10 UEFA Champions League by Greek club Olympiacos in the qualifying play-off for a spot in the group stage. Sheriff lost 2–0 in the first leg at home, and 1–0 in the second leg away.

However, by virtue of losing in the play-off round, Sheriff qualified for the 2009–10 UEFA Europa League group stage, where they were drawn into Group H alongside Fenerbahçe, Twente and Steaua București. On 17 September 2009, their first Europa League match, Sheriff drew 0–0 away against Steaua. On 1 October, Sheriff's first Europa League home match, the club lost 1–0 to Fenerbahçe. On 22 October, Sheriff produced a stunning 2–0 home victory over Twente, ending Twente's 17-match unbeaten run. 2 December, Sheriff drew 1–1 at home with Steaua. Sheriff failed to progress past the group stage after finishing third in Group H with five points, ahead of Steaua.

2010–11 UEFA Champions League
In the 2010–11 UEFA Champions League, on 14–20 July 2010, Sheriff defeated Dinamo Tirana in the second qualifying round (3–1, 0–1). Then, on 4 August, the club defeated Dinamo Zagreb on penalties (6–5) after identical 1–1 draws at home and away, thereby reaching the play-off round. On 18–24 August, in the play-off round against Basel, Sheriff lost 1–0 in Switzerland before losing 3–0 at home.

2010–11 UEFA Europa League
Dropping to the 2010–11 UEFA Europa League after their play-off defeat to Basel, Sheriff was drawn into Group E alongside Dynamo Kyiv, AZ and BATE Borisov. After losing their first match 2–1 away against AZ on 15 September 2010, on 30 September, Sheriff defeated Dynamo Kyiv 2–0 at home. After losing two-straight matches against BATE – 0–1 at home and 3–1 away on 21 October and 4 November respectively – on 2 December, Sheriff drew 1–1 with AZ at home, then on 15 December, Sheriff drew 0–0 against Dynamo Kyiv away in Kyiv. Accumulating five points, Sheriff failed to progress past the group stage after finishing last in Group E.

2013–14 UEFA Europa League

In the 2013–14 UEFA Europa League, Sheriff played in a group with Tottenham Hotspur, Anzhi Makhachkala and Tromsø, in which they finished third.

2017–18 UEFA Europa League
In the 2017–18 UEFA Europa League, Sheriff played in a group with Lokomotiv Moscow, Copenhagen, Fastav Zlín, in which they finished third once more.

2021–22 UEFA Champions League
In the 2021–22 UEFA Champions League, Sheriff became the first Moldovan team to qualify for the group stages of the competition after a 3–0 aggregate win over Dinamo Zagreb. They were drawn into Group D to face Inter Milan, Real Madrid and Shakhtar Donetsk. On 15 September, Sheriff won their opening group game, 2–0 against Shakhtar Donetsk, before following it up with an upset 2–1 away victory over Real Madrid at the Santiago Bernabéu on 28 September 2021, with Sébastien Thill scoring the winning goal in the 89th minute.  Despite losing their next three games against Inter Milan and Real Madrid, they secured qualification for the preliminary knockout round of the Europa League on 24 November 2021 when Shakhtar Donetsk lost to Inter Milan. They ended their campaign with a 1–1 away draw with Shakhtar Donetsk, which meant they ended up with a very respectable 7 points from their 6 games.

2021–22 UEFA Europa League
Sheriff had serious squad problems before the start of the UEFA Europa League knockout rounds. The departure of important players such as Cristiano da Silva Leite, Frank Castañeda, Danilo Arboleda, Dimitris Kolovos and Fernando Peixoto Costanza caused serious problems in the squad. Sheriff replaced all the departures with new players like Regi Lushkja, Gaby Kiki, Renan Guedes and Patrick Kpozo. However, the rules of the Moldovan championship allow teams to announce their new players from 23 February. Since the deadline for registration in the Europa League was February 2, coach Yuriy Vernydub was obliged to include players who had not played much in the starting line-up, such as Stjepan Radeljić, Stefanos Evangelou and Charles Petro. 

They were the first ever Moldovan side to play in the knockout stages of a European competition, and were drawn against S.C. Braga of Portugal. They won 2–0 in the initial home leg - with the goalscorers being Sébastien Thill and Adama Traoré in a game where Sheriff put in a solid performance despite having a vastly different squad to the one that stunned Real Madrid. Finally, the European campaign ended with a 2–0 defeat and a dramatic penalty shootout that ended 3–2 in favour of Braga.

Stadium

Sheriff Stadium is the home ground of Sheriff Tiraspol and is owned by the corporation Sheriff. Construction of the ground began on 1 August 2000 and was completed in May 2002, with the official opening in July 2002. It was renovated in 2011. The stadium has a seating capacity for 12,746 spectators and is eligible for FIFA/UEFA international events. Beside Sheriff, the stadium has also hosted matches for FC Tiraspol and the Moldova national team.

Aside from the main arena of Sheriff Sports Complex, there is also an 8,000 seater stadium, Malaya Sportivnaya Arena, also situated in the same complex, along with eight training fields, a covered training centre, housing for the players, a college for students and a five-star hotel.

In June 2022, UEFA ordered that no European games would be permitted to be played in Transnistria, as a direct consequence of the 2022 Russian invasion of Ukraine. Sheriff played all of their home fixtures in the 2022-23 UEFA Europa League and 2022-23 UEFA Europa Conference League at Zimbru Stadium in Chișinău.

Current squad

Out on loan

Honours

Records and statistics
Most appearances (443): Vazha Tarkhnishvili
Most goals (71): Alexey Kuchuk
Record victory (19 October 2005, Moldovan Cup): Sheriff–Viitorul Orhei, 16–0
Record defeat (UEFA Champions League, 25 July 2001): Anderlecht–Sheriff, 4–0
Biggest win in UEFA competition (23 July 2013): Sheriff–Sutjeska, 5–0
Appearances in UEFA Champions League: 13
Appearances in UEFA Europa League: 7
Player with most UEFA appearances: Vazha Tarkhnishvili (54)
Top scorers in UEFA club competitions: Ziguy Badibanga (8)

European record

Legend: GF = Goals For. GA = Goals Against. GD = Goal Difference.

Matches

UEFA rankings
As of 28 September 2021, Sheriff Tiraspol is ranked 58th in the UEFA club coefficient rankings, up from 108th the previous season.

As of 26 August 2021. Source

Club officials

Technical staff

Board of directors
As of 7 October 2016

Managers

  Ahmad Alaskarov (1997–1998)
  Sergei Borovski (2 January 1998 – 1 January 1999)
  Ivan Daniliants (1999–2000)
  Oleksandr Holokolosov (2001–2002)
  Mihai Stoichiță (1 January 2002 – 30 June 2002)
  Gavril Balint (1 July 2002 – 30 June 2003)
  Ihor Nakonechny (1 July 2003 – 30 June 2004)
  Leonid Kuchuk (1 January 2004 – 31 December 2009)
  Andrei Sosnitskiy (1 January 2010 – 30 April 2011)
  Vitali Rashkevich (30 April 2011 – 29 May 2012)
  Milan Milanović (1 July 2012 – 10 August 2012)
  Vitali Rashkevich (interim) (11 August 2012 – 15 August 2012)
  Mihai Stoichiță (15 August 2012 – 2 April 2013)
  Juan Ferrando (interim) (3 April 2013 – 8 July 2013)
  Juan Ferrando (July 2013 – December 2013)

Notes

References

External links

FC Sheriff Tiraspol at UEFA
Team info at Global Sports Archive

 
Sheriff Tiraspol
Sheriff Tiraspol
Sheriff Tiraspol
1997 establishments in Moldova
Tiraspol
Sheriff Tiraspol